Karnov's Revenge is a 1994 fighting game developed by Data East, released for the Neo Geo. It is the second game in the Fighter's History series. The game was later ported to the Neo Geo, Neo Geo CD and Sega Saturn home consoles.

Gameplay 

While the previous game was similar to Street Fighter'''s 6-button setup, the gameplay system of Karnov's Revenge is akin to SNK's fighting games such as Art of Fighting and Fatal Fury. Due to change of hardware to SNK's MVS platform, the control configuration was reduced from six attack buttons to just four (only light and heavy attacks are available this time).

A new gameplay feature is introduced in the form of "one-two attacks". When the player presses a heavy attack button while performing a light attack or blocking, the interval between light attacks is reduced, making combos easier to perform. While this feature is not mentioned on the instruction card, the final page of the home Neo Geo version's manual mentions it, describing as the "one-two attack" system.

All eleven fighters from the previous game return (including the bosses Clown and Karnov, who are now playable) and are joined by two new characters: Yungmie, a female taekwondo exponent from Korea, and Zazie, a karate practitioner from Kenya, for a total of 13 characters. Karnov is the only returning character who was given entirely new sprites. Most of the returning characters were given new special techniques (with a few exceptions), including hidden techniques which are not listed on the instruction card (the manual for the home version hints at their inclusion). The Ox that appeared in the bonus rounds in Karate Champ appears in this game as a secret boss if the player completes the game on the Normal setting or above without losing a round. The Ox is an unplayable character.

Release
The game was originally released in Japanese arcades on March 7, 1994, while Neo Geo home console version arrived on April 28. In addition to the ports for the Neo Geo home consoles, Karnov's Revenge was released for the Sega Saturn exclusively in Japan on July 4, 1997. The Saturn version allows players to assign all four basic attacks into a single button (C and Z by default), which is required for certain characters in order to perform certain special moves. A Virtual Console reissue of the Neo Geo version was released for the Wii in Japan on June 8, 2010 and in North America on December 27. It was also added to Zeebo on April 23, 2010. In 2017, Hamster Corporation released the game on PlayStation 4, Xbox One, Microsoft Windows, and Nintendo Switch under its Arcade Archives series.

Reception

In Japan, Game Machine listed Karnov's Revenge on their April 15, 1994 issue as being the fourth most-successful table arcade unit of the month. In North America, RePlay reported Karnov's Revenge to be the ninth most-popular arcade game at the time.

On release, Famicom Tsūshin scored the Neo Geo version of the game a 25 out of 40. GamePro rated it as a modest improvement over the first game, with faster-paced action but the same lack of likeable characters. However, they said the new characters are better than the old ones, especially Yungmie and her unique trait of using only her legs to attack.

Nintendo Life gave it mixed reviews to both the Wii Virtual Console release and the Nintendo Switch re-release. The author Corbie Dillard praised the weak point system and one-two attacks, but remarked they aren't enough to make the game any more notable than the other average fighting games. In the other review by Dave Frear, he said that attacks often do not flow together, sometimes making button mashing more effective than planned moves. At the end of the review, he recommended playing other fighting games like Art of Fighting, Fatal Fury, Samurai Shodown, World Heroes, Aggressors of Dark Kombat, and The King of Fighters.

See also
 Karnov Fighter's History characters''

Notes

References

External links 
 Karnov's Revenge at GameFAQs
 Karnov's Revenge at Giant Bomb
 Karnov's Revenge at Killer List of Videogames
 Karnov's Revenge at MobyGames

1994 video games
ACA Neo Geo games
Arcade video games
D4 Enterprise games
Data East video games
Fighting games
Multiplayer and single-player video games
Neo Geo games
Neo Geo CD games
Nintendo Switch games
PlayStation Network games
PlayStation 4 games
Rutubo Games games
Sega Saturn games
SNK games
Windows games
Xbox One games
Zeebo games
Video game sequels
Muay Thai video games
Video games set in Japan
Video games set in the United States
Video games set in China
Video games set in England
Video games set in Thailand
Video games set in France
Video games set in Italy
Video games set in Kenya
Video games set in South Korea
Video games set in Russia
Video games developed in Japan
Hamster Corporation games